Bloom is the fourth studio album by American dream pop duo Beach House. It was co-produced by the band and Chris Coady, and was released on May 15, 2012, by Sub Pop, in Europe by Bella Union, in Australia by Mistletone Records, and in Mexico by Arts & Crafts. The album was written over two years of touring and was recorded at Sonic Ranch in Tornillo, Texas, over seven weeks. Building on their previous album, Teen Dream (2010), the duo continued to add live drums to their song arrangements for Bloom, supplementing their drum machine rhythms.

Bloom received positive reviews from critics and debuted at number seven on the Billboard 200, selling 41,000 copies in its first week. It was ranked by many critics as one of the year's best albums, and in August 2014, was recognized on Pitchforks list of "The 100 Best Albums of the Decade So Far", appearing at number 53. It is now considered to be one of the best dream pop albums.

Recording
Bloom was written "between countless sound checks and myriad experiences during two years of tour", and was recorded at Sonic Ranch in Tornillo, Texas. It was co-produced by Chris Coady (Yeah Yeah Yeahs, Blonde Redhead), who also produced the band's previous album Teen Dream. Beach House chose to record in west Texas after being captivated by the area while resting there during a tour. Bloom was mixed at Electric Lady Studios in New York City. The album took seven weeks to record.

Victoria Legrand described the album's title as an "abstraction of many feelings". Legrand continued:
"To find a word or a set of words we felt curated the whole thing, Bloom was it. And it was based on feeling and just a belief in the word. It actually has more weight for me than it has an ethereal quality. It came about where it made sense. [...] For things to feel right, it definitely has to sit for a while and I think that's why it's not ethereal for me. I associate that word with fleeting or not having any substance, I don't know. [...] I'm just saying that for us there's a certain intensity with this record, and I think the word "bloom" is an attempt at that."

Release
The first song released from Bloom, "Myth", was posted on Beach House's website on March 7, 2012. On March 8, 2012, the album's release date was announced. A second song from the album, "Lazuli", was released as a Record Store Day single on April 13, 2012. On May 6, 2012, the album was streamed in its entirety on NPR Music. On June 6, 2012, the music video for "Lazuli", directed by Allen Cordell, was released. On March 19, 2013, the band released a music video for the track "Wishes". The video was directed by Eric Wareheim of comedy duo Tim and Eric.

"Equal Mind" (the B-side to "Lazuli"), "Saturn Song" (recorded during the Bloom sessions) and "Wherever You Go" (the Bloom hidden track) were all included in the band's 2017 compilation album B-Sides and Rarities.

Reception

Bloom has received mostly positive reviews from music critics. At Metacritic, which assigns a normalized rating out of 100 to reviews from mainstream critics, the album received an average score of 78, based on 45 reviews, which indicates "generally favorable reviews". PopMatters''' Zachary Houle gave the album a perfect score and praised it as "simply, in the most awe-inspired sense of the term, absolutely golden from end to end—a real treasure and an utter delight to experience every time you play it." J. Pace of Under the Radar also praised the album, writing, "It's always a perfect pairing of nostalgia and wistfulness with these two [Victoria Legrand and Alex Scally], who serve up these completely affecting but somehow ethereal moods you can't quite put your finger on." Pitchforks Lindsay Zoladz gave the album a Best New Album designation and praised the interplay between Legrand and Scally, writing that the two "sound in perfect sync: his nimble riffs punctuate her long, drawn-out notes to add depth and layered rhythm to the tracks." Harley Brown of Consequence of Sound stated that Bloom "culminates six years and three albums of anticipatory ache with subtlety and meticulous song placement that unfolds if you let it", while BBC Music's Hari Ashurst felt that the album was the band's best work thus far.

Will Hermes of Rolling Stone said that "the melodies, guitarscapes and thrift-shop organ swells make for exquisite comfort". Zack Kotzer and David Greenwald of The A.V. Club gave the album an A−, saying "Bloom takes what worked before and intensifies it" and that with the record, "they have mastered their sultry formula". Other reviews of Bloom were more mixed. Annie Zaleski of Alternative Press felt that the album did not possess "as many memorable hooks (or as many well-defined song structures)" as the band's previous album, Teen Dream, and that as a result, "the record tends to fade into the background and become something so indistinct that it's forgettable, even after multiple listens." Maddy Costa of The Guardian criticized the album's lack of surprises, writing that "nothing happens to shatter the perfect surface, either within individual songs or across the album as a whole, and that might be Blooms problem. It's beautiful, spectral, dreamy, but never makes your pulse quicken."

Accolades
Bloom appeared on many year-end lists of critics ranking the year's top albums, several of them with the album being included in the top 10: Urban outfitters ranked the album at number two on their list, Magnet and Under the Radar at number three, PopMatters and Obscure Sound at number four and Idolator, Consequence of Sound, Gorilla vs. Bear and Pitchfork at number seven, with Pitchfork adding: "since 2006's self-titled debut, Beach House have been patiently refining and expanding a singular, easily recognizable sound." Stereogum and Rolling Stone listed the album at #27 and #28 respectively,50 Best Albums of 2012. Rolling Stone. Retrieved 23 December 2012. with the latter saying "Languid lead singer Victoria Legrand has some dark stuff on her mind – mortality and ruin keep bubbling to the surface of the Baltimore act's fourth LP...But you'd hardly know it from the blissful way she lets her voice blend with the softly bobbing organ chords and arpeggiated guitars." Rolling Stone also named the song "Other People" the 19th best song of 2012.

Track listing
All lyrics written by Victoria Legrand; all music composed and arranged by Alex Scally and Legrand with assistance from Daniel Franz.

Personnel
Credits adapted from liner notes of Bloom.Beach House Victoria Legrand – vocals, keyboards, organ, piano
 Alex Scally – guitar, basses, piano, organ and keyboards, backing vocals; drum machine edits/programmingAdditional musicians Daniel Franz – live drums and percussion
 Joe Cueto – viola Production Chris Coady – production, engineering, mixing
 Beach House – production
 Manuel Calderon – assistant engineering
 Brooks Harlan – engineering
 Phil Joly – assistant engineering
 Joe LaPorta – masteringArtwork' Beach House – photography
 Brian Roettinger – design

 Music videos 
In 2013, the band produced a short film titled "Forever Still," which included "Wild," "The Hours," "Lazuli," and "Irene." They may be viewed individually or as a whole, as seen below:
 
 
 
 
 

Other music videos from the album include: 
 , which was voted #7 in Rolling Stone's'' "10 Best Music Videos of 2013"

Charts

Weekly charts

Year-end charts

Release history

References

External links
 Sub Pop Records' page on Bloom 
 Sub Pop Records' page on Beach House

2012 albums
Beach House albums
Sub Pop albums
Albums recorded at Sonic Ranch
Albums produced by Chris Coady